The 2006–07 European Challenge Cup pool stage was the opening stage of the 11th season of the European Challenge Cup, the second-tier competition for European rugby union clubs. It began with five matches on 20 October 2006 and ended with the final seven pool games on 20 January 2007.

Twenty teams participated in this phase of the competition; they were divided into five pools of four teams each, with each team playing the others home and away. Competition points were earned using the standard bonus point system. The five pool winners and the best three runners-up advanced to the knockout stage. These teams then competed in a single-elimination tournament that ended with the final at the Twickenham Stoop in London on 19 May 2007.

Results
All times are local to the game location.

{| class="wikitable"
|+ Key to colours
|-
| style="background: #ccffcc;" |     
| Winner of each pool, advance to quarterfinals. Seed # in parentheses
|-
| style="background: #ccccff;" |     
| Three highest-scoring second-place teams advance to quarterfinals. Seed # in parentheses
|}

Pool 1

Pool 2

Pool 3

Pool 4

Pool 5

Seeding and runners-up

See also
European Challenge Cup
2006–07 Heineken Cup

References

pool stage
2006-07